Maleki (also Romanized as Malekī; also known as Maliki) is a village in Petergan Rural District, Central District, Zirkuh County, South Khorasan Province, Iran. At the 2006 census, its population was 466, in 120 families.

References 

Populated places in Zirkuh County